Nevena Kokanova (12 December 1938 – 3 June 2000) was a Bulgarian film actress. She was known as the "first lady of Bulgarian cinema." Her mother was from a well-known Austrian aristocratic family, and her father was a political prisoner.

Early life
Kokanova was born in Dupnitsa, Bulgaria and is most renowned for her role as Lisa in The Peach Thief. She started her career at age 18 as an apprentice actor with the Yambol Theater in Yambol, Bulgaria.

Career
In 1975 she was a member of the jury at the 9th Moscow International Film Festival. In 1980 she starred in and co-directed Three Deadly Sins with Lyubomir Sharlandzhiev.

She died in Sofia, Bulgaria from cancer.

Filmography

References

External links
 

Bulgarian film actresses
Bulgarian stage actresses
Bulgarian film directors
1938 births
2000 deaths
People from Dupnitsa
20th-century Bulgarian actresses
Bulgarian television actresses
Deaths from cancer in Bulgaria